is a 2010 Japanese film directed by Takahisa Zeze. It was screened in the Main Programme of the Forum section at the 61st Berlin International Film Festival, where it won the FIPRESCI Prize. It has also won the Séquences Prize at the Fantasia 
International Film Festival.

Plot
Heaven's Story shows a murder and how it changes the lives of those people who were closely related to the victims.

Cast
 Moeki Tsuruoka
 Tomoharu Hasegawa
 Shugo Oshinari
 Jun Murakami
 Hako Yamazaki
 Noriko Eguchi
 Mitsuru Fukikoshi
 Kyusaku Shimada
 Shun Sugata
 Ken Mitsuishi
 Kanji Tsuda
 Makiko Watanabe
 Nao Nagasawa
 Kōichi Satō
 Akira Emoto

References

External links
  
 

2010 films
Films directed by Takahisa Zeze
2010s Japanese-language films
2010s Japanese films